Demétrius Conrado Ferraciú, also commonly known simply as Demétrius (alternate spelling: Ferracciú) (born 17 July 1973) is a Brazilian former professional basketball player and coach.

Career
During his pro club career, Demétrius won 6 Brazilian Championships, in the years 1993, 1997, 1998, 2000, 2001, and 2005. With the senior Brazilian national basketball team, Demétrius competed at the 1996 Summer Olympics, the 1998 FIBA World Cup, and the 2002 FIBA World Cup.

After he retired from playing professional basketball, Demétrius began a career working as a basketball coach.

References

External links
FIBA Profile
CBB Profile 

1973 births
Living people
1998 FIBA World Championship players
Associação Bauru Basketball coaches
Associação Limeirense de Basquete coaches
Basketball players at the 1996 Summer Olympics
Brazilian basketball coaches
Brazilian men's basketball players
CR Vasco da Gama basketball players
Franca Basquetebol Clube players
Minas Tênis Clube basketball players
Olympic basketball players of Brazil
Point guards
Shooting guards
Basketball players from São Paulo